Psychophysiology is a monthly peer-reviewed scientific journal published by Wiley-Blackwell on behalf of the Society for Psychophysiological Research. The editor-in-chief is Monica Fabiani (University of Illinois at Urbana-Champaign).

Abstracting and indexing
The journal is abstracted and indexed in:

According to the Journal Citation Reports, the journal has a 2020 impact factor of 4.016.

References

External links

Wiley-Blackwell academic journals
English-language journals
Publications established in 1964
Psychology journals
Monthly journals
Physiology journals